1992 in sports describes the year's events in world sport.

Alpine skiing
 Alpine Skiing World Cup
 Men's overall season champion: Paul Accola, Switzerland
 Women's overall season champion: Petra Kronberger, Austria

American football
 Super Bowl XXVI – the Washington Redskins (NFC) won 37–24 over the Buffalo Bills (AFC)
Location: Metrodome
Attendance: 63,130
MVP: Mark Rypien, QB (Washington)
 Orange Bowl (1991 season): 
 The Miami Hurricanes won 22-0 over the Nebraska Cornhuskers to win the AP Poll national championship
Steve Emtman is the No. 1 pick in the 1992 NFL Draft by the Indianapolis Colts
 June 25 – death of Jerome Brown (27), Philadelphia Eagles player, in a car crash
 Steve Young (American football), quarterback of the San Francisco 49ers, wins the 1992 NFL MVP
 November 29 – Dennis Byrd of the New York Jets is paralyzed from a neck injury during a game against the Kansas City Chiefs. He made a recovery that bordered on the miraculous; although he would never play again, he would walk unassisted several months later.
Gino Torretta of the Miami Hurricanes wins the Heisman Trophy, Davey O'Brien Award and Walter Camp Award

Association football
 June 26 – In Euro 1992, Denmark surprisingly won 2–0 over Germany at Nya Ullevi, Gothenburg, Sweden.
 November 25 - UEFA Champions League debuts with four opening day matches.
 December 5th

Charlton Athletic FC return to The Valley after a seven year exodus playing at Selhurst Park and Upton Park, and a long struggle to return:

Charlton supporters formed a  political party called 'The Valley Party' to contest the local May 1990 Greenwich elections on one single policy: to return to The Valley.

It was a lively and passionate debate about something which mattered deeply to the community, and using a professional poster campaign that startled the mainstream political parties, The Valley Part obtained 14,838 votes as the team slipped back into the Second Division. A  modest proposal for The Valley was put together – and promptly delayed for six months by a strike in Greenwich’s planning department.

In April 1991, a scheme was at last approved. The final matches were counted down at Selhurst, only to have to report, mid-summer, that the new venue would not be The Valley but Upton Park.

The club had run out of time to get the ground ready for the start of the 1991/92 season. Weeks later it became clear it had also run out of money. The contractors had pulled off site because they had not been paid.

The financially stricken Norris quit the board. New directors Martin Simons and Richard Murray took up the slack, along with Roger Alwen, who had become chairman in 1989.

Yet another season rolled by until the club and fans came up with the Valley Investment Plan to contribute towards the necessary finance. It was launched in June 1992.

The scheme, which offered fans ten years of free or discounted tickets in return for an upfront payment, pulled in £1m, towards an eventual £4.5m bill. Another £1m was contributed as a grant by the Football Trust. Directors bravely stumped up the rest.

So finally, in December 1992, seven years, two months and two weeks after the “last” match at The Valley, the Addicks returned home, amid many tears and cheers, beating Portsmouth 1-0.

Athletics
1992 Summer Olympics held in Barcelona, Spain July 25 – August 9.
1992 Winter Olympics held in Albertville, France February 8 – February 23
March 1 – Madina Biktagirova set a course record at the Los Angeles Marathon in a time of 2:26:23.

Australian rules football
 Australian Football League
 May 3 – Geelong beat Fitzroy's 1979 record score when they kick 37.17 (239) to Brisbane's 11.9 (75)
 August 23 – West Coast kick only 0.2 (2) to three-quarter time against  on a waterlogged Western Oval for the lowest three-quarter-time score since 1953.
 September 26 – West Coast win the 96th AFL premiership, beating Geelong 16.17 (113) to 12.13 (85)
 Geelong kick a record total of 3,558 points during the season, beating their own record from 1989.
 Brownlow Medal awarded to Scott Wynd (Footscray)

Baseball
 World Series – Toronto Blue Jays won 4 games to 2 over the Atlanta Braves. The Series MVP is Pat Borders, Toronto.
 The Toronto Blue Jays became the first Canadian team to play in a World Series and the first non-American team to win the World Series.

AWARDS and HONORS

Most Valuable Player
Dennis Eckersley, Oakland Athletics (AL)
Barry Bonds, Pittsburgh Pirates (NL)
Cy Young Award
Dennis Eckersley, Oakland Athletics (AL)
Greg Maddux, Chicago Cubs (NL)
Rookie of the Year
Pat Listach, Milwaukee Brewers (AL)
Eric Karros, Los Angeles Dodgers (NL)
Rolaids Relief Man of the Year Award
Dennis Eckersley, Oakland Athletics (AL)
Lee Smith, St. Louis Cardinals (NL)
Manager of the Year
Tony La Russa, Oakland Athletics (AL)
Jim Leyland, Pittsburgh Pirates (NL)

*College World Series Pepperdine Waves defeat Cal State Fullerton Titans 3–2
Phil Nevin of Cal State Fullerton Titans is named the tournaments Most Outstanding Player and awarded the Golden Spikes Award for college player of the year

Basketball
 European Cup – Partizan beats Joventut 71:70
 NCAA Men's Basketball Championship – Duke Blue Devils wins 71–51 over Michigan Wolverines
 Christian Laettner is named Naismith College Player of the Year
 NBA Finals – Chicago Bulls win 4 games to 2 over the Portland Trail Blazers
Most Valuable Player: Michael Jordan, Chicago Bulls
Rookie of the Year: Larry Johnson, Charlotte Hornets
Defensive Player of the Year: David Robinson, San Antonio Spurs
Sixth Man of the Year: Detlef Schrempf, Indiana Pacers
Most Improved Player: Pervis Ellison, Washington Bullets
Coach of the Year: Don Nelson, Golden State Warriors
All-NBA First Team:
F – Karl Malone, Utah Jazz
F – Chris Mullin, Golden State Warriors
C – David Robinson, San Antonio Spurs
G – Michael Jordan, Chicago Bulls
G – Clyde Drexler, Portland Trail Blazers
All-NBA Second Team:
F – Scottie Pippen, Chicago Bulls
F – Charles Barkley, Philadelphia 76ers
C – Patrick Ewing, New York Knicks
G – Tim Hardaway, Golden State Warriors
G – John Stockton, Utah Jazz
 All-NBA Third Team:
F – Dennis Rodman, Detroit Pistons
F – Kevin Willis, Atlanta Hawks
C – Brad Daugherty, Cleveland Cavaliers
G – Mark Price, Cleveland Cavaliers
G – Kevin Johnson, Phoenix Suns
All-NBA Rookie Team:
Steve Smith, Miami Heat
Larry Johnson, Charlotte Hornets
Billy Owens, Golden State Warriors
Stacey Augmon, Atlanta Hawks
Dikembe Mutombo, Denver Nuggets
NBA All-Defensive First Team:
Dennis Rodman, Detroit Pistons
Scottie Pippen, Chicago Bulls
David Robinson, San Antonio Spurs
Michael Jordan, Chicago Bulls
Joe Dumars, Detroit Pistons
NBA All-Defensive Second Team:
Larry Nance, Cleveland Cavaliers
Buck Williams, Portland Trail Blazers
Patrick Ewing, New York Knicks
John Stockton, Utah Jazz
Micheal Williams, Indiana Pacers
 National Basketball League (Australia) Finals: South East Melbourne Magic defeated the Melbourne Tigers 2–1 in the best-of-three final series.

Boxing
 November 13 – Riddick Bowe won a 12 round decision over Evander Holyfield to win the undisputed heavyweight championship.
 Oscar De La Hoya won the only Gold Medal in the Barcelona Olympic Games for the United States. He turned pro shortly after.

Canadian football
 Grey Cup – Calgary Stampeders won 24–10 over the Winnipeg Blue Bombers
 Vanier Cup – Queen's Golden Gaels win 31–0 over the St. Mary's Huskies

Cricket
 Cricket World Cup – Pakistan beat England by 22 runs

Cycling
 Giro d'Italia won by Miguel Indurain of Spain
 Tour de France – Miguel Indurain of Spain
 UCI Road World Championships – Men's road race – Gianni Bugno of Italy

Dogsled racing
 Iditarod Trail Sled Dog Race Champion –
 Martin Buser wins with lead dogs: Tyrone & D2

Darts
Phil Taylor (darts player) won his second world title

The Professional Darts Corporation was formed but did not have its first world championship until 1993

Field hockey
 Men's Champions Trophy: Germany
 Olympic Games men's competition: Germany

Figure skating
 World Figure Skating Championships –
 Men's champion: Viktor Petrenko, CIS
 Ladies' champion: Kristi Yamaguchi, United States
 Pair skating champions: Natalia Mishkutenok & Artur Dmitriev, CIS
 Ice dancing champions: Marina Klimova & Sergei Ponomarenko, CIS

Gaelic Athletic Association
 Camogie
 All-Ireland Camogie Champion: Cork
 National Camogie League: Cork
 Gaelic football
 All-Ireland Senior Football Championship – Donegal 0–18 died Dublin 0–14
 National Football League – Derry 1–10 died Tyrone 1–8
 Ladies' Gaelic football
 All-Ireland Senior Football Champion: Waterford
 National Football League: Waterford
 Hurling
 All-Ireland Senior Hurling Championship – Kilkenny 3–10 died Cork 1–12
 National Hurling League – Limerick 2–6 beat Tipperary 0–10

Golf
Men's professional
 Masters Tournament – Fred Couples
 U.S. Open – Tom Kite
 British Open – Nick Faldo
 PGA Championship – Nick Price
 PGA Tour money leader – Fred Couples – $1,344,188
 Senior PGA Tour money leader – Lee Trevino – $1,027,002
Men's amateur
 British Amateur – Stephen Dundas
 U.S. Amateur – Justin Leonard
 European Amateur – Massimo Scarpa
Women's professional
 Nabisco Dinah Shore – Dottie Mochrie
 LPGA Championship – Betsy King
 U.S. Women's Open – Patty Sheehan
 Classique du Maurier – Sherri Steinhauer
 LPGA Tour money leader – Dottie Mochrie – $693,335
 The European team beat the United States team 11  points to 6 , to win the Solheim Cup for the first time.

Harness racing
 Pacer Artsplace voted "Harness Horse of the Year"
 North America Cup – Safely Kept
 United States Pacing Triple Crown races –
 Cane Pace – Western Hanover
 Little Brown Jug – Fake Left
 Messenger Stakes – Western Hanover
 United States Trotting Triple Crown races –
 Hambletonian – Alf Palema
 Yonkers Trot – Magic Lobell
 Kentucky Futurity – Armbro Keepsake
 Australian Inter Dominion Harness Racing Championship –
 Pacers: Westburn Grant
 Trotters: William Dee

Horse racing
Steeplechases
 Cheltenham Gold Cup – Cool Ground
 Grand National – Party Politics
Flat races
 Australia – Melbourne Cup won by Subzero
 Canada – Queen's Plate won by Alydeed
 France – Prix de l'Arc de Triomphe won by Subotica
 Ireland – Irish Derby Stakes won by St Jovite
 Japan – Japan Cup won by Tokai Teio
 English Triple Crown Races:
 2,000 Guineas Stakes – Rodrigo de Triano
 The Derby – Dr Devious
 St. Leger Stakes – User Friendly
 United States Triple Crown Races:
Kentucky Derby – Lil E. Tee
 Preakness Stakes – Pine Bluff
 Belmont Stakes – A.P. Indy
 Breeders' Cup World Thoroughbred Championships:
 Breeders' Cup Classic – A.P. Indy
 Breeders' Cup Ladies' Classic – Paseana
 Breeders' Cup Juvenile – Gilded Time
 Breeders' Cup Juvenile Fillies – Eliza
 Breeders' Cup Mile – Lure
 Breeders' Cup Sprint – Thirty Slews
 Breeders' Cup Turf – Fraise

Ice hockey
 April 1 – The NHL had their first work stoppage as NHL players went on strike. The strike lasted only 10 days and the rest of the regular season games were played.
 Art Ross Trophy as the NHL's leading scorer during the regular season: Mario Lemieux, Pittsburgh Penguins
 Hart Memorial Trophy for the NHL's Most Valuable Player: Mark Messier, New York Rangers
 Stanley Cup – Pittsburgh Penguins won 4 games to 0 over the Chicago Blackhawks
 Conn Smythe Trophy – Mario Lemieux, Pittsburgh Penguins
 World Hockey Championship
 Men's champion: Sweden defeated Finland
 Junior Men's champion: Unified former USSR defeated Sweden
 Women's champion: Canada defeated the United States
 September 23 – Manon Rhéaume became the first woman to play in the National Hockey League during a pre-season game, and also the first woman ever to play in one of the Big Four Pro Sports.

Lacrosse
 The Buffalo Bandits defeat the Philadelphia Wings 11–10 in overtime to win the Major Indoor Lacrosse League championship

Motorsport

Radiosport
 Sixth Amateur Radio Direction Finding World Championship held in Siófok, Hungary.

Rugby league
 Challenge Cup tournament culminates in Wigan's 28–12 win over Castleford in the final at Wembley Stadium before 77,286
 Rugby Football League Championship is won by Wigan
 3 June – Sydney, Australia: 1992 State of Origin is won by New South Wales in the third and deciding match of the series against Queensland at the Sydney Football Stadium before 41,878
June/July – The 1992 Great Britain Lions tour of Australia and New Zealand takes place
 27 September – Sydney, Australia: 1992 NSWRL season Grand Final is won 28–8 by Brisbane Broncos against St George Dragons at Sydney Football Stadium before 41,560
 24 October – London, England: 1989–92 World Cup tournament culminates in Australia's 10–6 win over Great Britain in the final at Wembley Stadium before 73,631
 30 October – Wigan, England: 1992 World Club Challenge match is won by the Brisbane Broncos who defeat Wigan 22–8 at Central Park before 17,764

Rugby union
 98th Five Nations Championship series is won by England who complete the Grand Slam

Snooker
 World Snooker Championship – Stephen Hendry beats Jimmy White 18–14
 World rankings – Stephen Hendry remains world number one for 1992/93

Swimming
 XXV Olympic Games, held in Barcelona, Spain (July 26 – July 31)
 Second European Sprint Championships, held in Espoo, Finland (December 21 – 22)
 Germany wins the most medals (14), Germany and Sweden the most gold medals (4)

Tennis
 Grand Slam in tennis men's results:
 Australian Open – Jim Courier
 French Open – Jim Courier
 Wimbledon – Andre Agassi
 U.S. Open – Stefan Edberg
 Grand Slam in tennis women's results:
 Australian Open – Monica Seles
 French Open – Monica Seles
 Wimbledon – Steffi Graf
 U.S. Open – Monica Seles
 1992 Summer Olympics
 Men's Singles Competition: Marc Rosset
 Women's Singles Competition: Jennifer Capriati
 Men's Doubles Competition: Boris Becker & Michael Stich
 Women's Doubles Competition: Gigi Fernández & Mary Joe Fernández
 Davis Cup
 United States won 3–1 over Switzerland in world tennis.

Triathlon
ITU World Championships held in Huntsville, Canada
ITU World Cup (ten races) started in Colombia and ended in Mexico
ETU European Championships held in Lommel, Belgium

Volleyball
 Men's World League: Italy
 Olympic Games men's competition: Brazil
 Olympic Games women's competition: Cuba

Yacht racing
 The San Diego Yacht Club retains the America's Cup as America³ defeats Italian challenger Il Moro de Venezia, from the Compagnia della Vella yacht club, 4 races to 1

Water polo
 Olympic Games men's competition: Italy

Multi-sport events
 1992 Summer Olympics takes place in Barcelona, Spain
 The Unified Team (formerly Soviet Union) wins the most medals (112) and the most gold medals (45).
 1992 Winter Olympics takes place in Albertville, France
 Germany wins the most medals (27) and the most gold medals (10).
 Seventh Pan Arab Games held in Damascus, Syria

Awards 
 Associated Press Male Athlete of the Year – Michael Jordan, NBA basketball
 Associated Press Female Athlete of the Year – Monica Seles, Tennis
Sports Illustrated Sportsman of the Year – Arthur Ashe
Sporting News Sportsman of the Year – Mike Krzyzewski Duke Blue Devils head coach
James E. Sullivan Award Bonnie Blair, speed skating

References

 
Sports by year